Lu Ann Hampton Laverty Oberlander is the second play in the series A Texas Trilogy by Preston Jones.

History 
The original name of A Texas Trilogy was The Bradleyville Trilogy.  The trilogy was first performed in its entirety at the Dallas Theater Center in 1975.

References 
 https://archive.today/20120713074945/http://alkek.library.txstate.edu/swwc/archives/writers/jones.html

External links 
 

1974 plays